Heiward Mak Hei-yan is a Hong Kong film director, writer and producer. Her work has been featured at various international film festivals including Singapore, Bratislava and Fribourg. In 2011, she won a Hong Kong Film Award for Best Screenplay for her writing on Love in a Puff.

Biography
Mak was born in 1984 and grew up in Tai Wai, Hong Kong where she attend Sha Tin Government Secondary School. She received a diploma in graphic design at Hong Kong Polytechnic University in 2003. After graduation, she worked as a graphic artist before enrolling at City University of Hong Kong within the school of Creative Media. Her thesis film Lovers’ Lover won a Gold Award at the IFVA in their Open Category section. Her teacher Patrick Tam later showed Lovers’ Lover  to actor Eric Tsang. This landed Mak a casting job on the comedy film Men Suddenly in Black 2, which Tsang acted in and co-produced. Mak had written a few lines of dialogue for the casting process as the screenplay had not been written that early into production. After Tsang read what Mak had written, he offered her a co-writer position. 

She graduated with a BA in Creative Media in 2006.

In 2008, Mak made her directorial debut when producer Eric Tsang gave her the opportunity to film a remake of Winds of September which later became High Noon. For her work she was nominated for a Hong Kong Film Award for Best New Director and given a Film of Merit by the Hong Kong Film Critics Society.

After directing the film Ex, she worked alongside to Pang Ho-cheung to make romantic comedy Love in a Puff which went on to earn her a Hong Kong Film Award for Best Screenplay.

Filmography

See also 

 Wong Chun—Hong Kong director and fellow City University alumni who got his start in the industry working with Eric Tsang
 Jun Li (director)—Hong Kong director; Mak was the editor for his film Drifting

References

External links
 
 

1984 births
Living people
Hong Kong film directors
Hong Kong film actresses